Yoshitomi Station (吉富駅) is the name of two train stations in Japan:

 Yoshitomi Station (Fukuoka)
 Yoshitomi Station (Kyoto)